Shenmue Online (シェンムーオンライン「莎木OL, Shenmū Onrain) was an announced MMORPG where players participate in scenarios from Shenmue II, joining one of three clans, led by Shen Hua, Xiu Ying, and Wu Ying Ren, all significant characters from the story.

Development history
In 2004, Shenmue Online was announced to be development in joint venture between Sega Japan and JC Entertainment of Korea. A private beta testing period was due to begin in South Korea in November 2005, with a public beta in China in spring 2005, before a release later in 2005. When Shenmue Online was first announced, under the development of JC Entertainment, the screenshots released were considered by many Shenmue fans to be disappointing graphically, especially as being part of a game series that boasted ground-breaking graphics on the Dreamcast.

In 2005, JC Entertainment pulled out of the development of Shenmue Online, and as they owned 50% of the properties of Shenmue Online, there was legal debate over who had the rights to the game. However, in November 2005, it was confirmed in an interview with Yu Suzuki that even though the Korean company JCE had announced their withdrawal from development, since Shenmue Online is a Sega venture, they would fulfil their duty of completing it. Yu said despite the internet rumours, development was well on its way and following their original goals and target. He added that Sega Sammy would make an official announcement about its progress in the future.

At the China Joy convention in July 2006 with the development under the guise of a Taiwan based company, a trailer was shown, which showcased features including mini games and combat with marked graphical improvements.

In 2006, six new screens from the gameplay along with a 14-minute video were released to the public during the fourth China Expo. These shots showed further improvement on graphical issues, comparing the graphics to other MMOs and even home versions of Shenmue.

Since 2007, news about Shenmue Online has slowly declined and reports of its cancellation have appeared on Destructoid and Wired News. Sega have yet to publicly confirm or deny the reports.

Gameplay
Quoted from an interpretation of Yu Suzuki's 2005-11-05 interview:

Notes

External links
 Official website via Internet Archive

Cancelled Windows games
Massively multiplayer online role-playing games
Shenmue
Vaporware video games
Video games designed by Yu Suzuki